Graeme Whifler (born 1951 in San Mateo, California) is an American screenwriter and film director.

Whifler has written and directed numerous movies, television documentaries, videos, and music videos. He directed films like Neighborhood Watch, and TV shows like Secrets & Mysteries, along with co-directing the unfinished film Vileness Fats with The Residents. He also wrote the screenplay for the horror film Dr. Giggles and the cult film Sonny Boy.

Whifler has directed music videos for bands such as Renaldo and the Loaf, The Residents, Yello, Tuxedomoon, Red Hot Chili Peppers, and Snakefinger from the late 1970s to mid-1980s.

Whifler currently resides in the Chevy Chase area of Glendale and is co-President of the Chevy Chase Estates Association

References

External links

Fandango
Interview

Living people
People from San Mateo, California
American male screenwriters
Film directors from California
1951 births
Screenwriters from California